WDR75 is a human protein encoded by the WDR75 gene containing a WD40 superfamily domain. The WD40 domain is found throughout many eukaryotic cell types and is known to be involved in cellular regulator functions such as pre-mRNA processing and cytoskeleton assembly. The function of the WDR75 protein is not defined by the scientific community.

Protein sequence
The amino acid sequence is 830 residues long and contains an acidic tail.

1 MVEEENIRVV RCGGSELNFR RAVFSADSKY IFCVSGDFVK VYSTVTEECV HILHGHRNLV 
61 TGIQLNPNNH LQLYSCSLDG TIKLWDYIDG ILIKTFIVGC KLHALFTLAQ AEDSVFVIVN 
121 KEKPDIFQLV SVKLPKSSSQ EVEAKELSFV LDYINQSPKC IAFGNEGVYV AAVREFYLSV 
181 YFFKKKTTSR FTLSSSRNKK HAKNNFTCVA CHPTEDCIAS GHMDGKIRLW RNFYDDKKYT 
241 YTCLHWHHDM VMDLAFSVTG TSLLSGGRES VLVEWRDATE KNKEFLPRLG ATIEHISVSP 
301 AGDLFCTSHS DNKIIIIHRN LEASAVIQGL VKDRSIFTGL MIDPRTKALV LNGKPGHLQF 
361 YSLQSDKQLY NLDIIQQEYI NDYGLIQIEL TKAAFGCFGN WLATVEQRQE KETELELQMK 
421 LWMYNKKTQG FILNTKINMP HEDCITALCF CNAEKSEQPT LVTASKDGYF KVWILTDDSD 
481 IYKKAVGWTC DFVGSYHKYQ ATNCCFSEDG SLLAVSFEEI VTIWDSVTWE LKCTFCQRAG 
541 KIRHLCFGRL TCSKYLLGAT ENGILCCWNL LSCALEWNAK LNVRVMEPDP NSENIAAISQ 
601 SSVGSDLFVF KPSEPRPLYI QKGISREKVQ WGVFVPRDVP ESFTSEAYQW LNRSQFYFLT 
661 KSQSLLTFST KSPEEKLTPT SKQLLAEESL PTTPFYFILG KHRQQQDEKL NETLENELVQ 
721 LPLTENIPAI SELLHTPAHV LPSAAFLCSM FVNSLLLSKE TKSAKEIPED VDMEEEKESE 
781 DSDEENDFTE KVQDTSNTGL GEDIIHQLSK SEEKELRKFR KIDYSWIAAL

Secondary structure
The secondary structure is predicted to contain alternating sets of alpha helices and beta strands.  No helix-turn-helix (HTH) regions were predicted.

Homology
No known paralogs exist for the Human gene. No paralogs were found for the cow, mouse, or rat orthologs of WDR75. Conservation among mammalian orthologs to the human gene was strong, with minimum identity among orthologs at 76%.  The following table summarizes some vertebrate and invertebrate orthologs. Conservation of specific amino acids from positions 340-390, 430- 450, and 515-530 all correlate to predicted alpha helices.

References

Human proteins